Khozmino is a rural locality (a settlement) and the administrative center of Khozminskoye Rural Settlement of Velsky District, Arkhangelsk Oblast, Russia. The population was 456 as of 2014. There are 9 streets.

Geography 
Khozmino is located on the Vel River, 42 km northwest of Velsk (the district's administrative centre) by road. Ispolinovka is the nearest rural locality.

References 

Rural localities in Velsky District